RRRrrrr!!! is a 2004 French comedy film, co-written, produced and directed by Alain Chabat. It stars Maurice Barthélémy, Pierre-François Martin-Laval, Jean-Paul Rouve, Marina Foïs, Elise Larnicol, Alain Chabat, Pascal Vincent, Jean Rochefort and Gérard Depardieu. The film was a box office bomb.

Plot
35,000 years ago, in the Stone Age, two neighbouring tribes lived in peace. The Tribe of Clean Hair was peaceful, due to its possession of the shampoo formula. The Tribe of Dirty Hair is at odds with the Tribe of Clean Hair due to this, and their leader wished for access to the formula of shampoo..

The leader of the Dirty Hair tribe decides to send a spy to steal the recipe. But a far more serious event would upset the life of Clean Hair tribe; for the first time in the history of humanity, a murder had been committed.

The tribes begin the first criminal investigation in human history.

Cast
   
 Maurice Barthélémy as Pierre, the leader of the Clean Hair Tribe
 Jean-Paul Rouve as Pierre, the blond
 Pierre-François Martin-Laval as Pierre, the tuft
 Elise Larnicol as Pierre, leader's wife
 Pascal Vincent as Pierre, the night crier "préveneur"
 Alain Chabat as Pierre, the healer (French: "le guérissologue")
 Gérard Depardieu as Tonton, the new leader of the Dirty Hair Tribe
 Marina Foïs as Guy
 Sébastien Thiéry as Pierre the archeologic excavator, the "fouillologue"
 Damien Jouillerot as Trapper 1
 Samir Guesmi as Trapper 2
 Cyril Casmèze as Tonton, the mute Dirty Hair
 Jean Rochefort as Lucie, the leader of the Dirty Hair Tribe
 Dominique Farrugia as the cudgel maker "gourdinier"
 Joeystarr as the cudgel tester "L'essayeur de gourdins"
 Cheikna Sankare as the cudgel practice target "L'essayé de gourdins"
 Valérie Lemercier as Pierre, couture guitar's teacher
 Maroussia Dubreuil as Pierre, couture guitar's student
 Gilles David as Pierre, the too great 1 
 Jean-Paul Bonnaire as Pierre, the too great 2
 Édith Le Merdy as Pierre, the blond's mother
 Bernard Cheron as Pierre, the blond's father
 Xavier Maly as Pierre
 Dominique Besnehard as Pierre
 Juliette Poissonnier as Pierre, the babysitter "gardeuse"
 Olivier Baroux as the Narrator

Release dates

References

Nesselson, Lisa. RRRrrrr!!!, Variety. 27 January 2004.  Accessed 2 September 2011.

External links

French comedy films
Films set in prehistory
Films directed by Alain Chabat
2000s French films